The Chesapeake Research Consortium, Inc. (CRC) is a not-for-profit corporation chartered by the State of Maryland. It is an association of seven institutions, each with a long-standing involvement in research on problems affecting the Chesapeake Bay and its watershed. The Chesapeake Research Consortium supports scientific and technical activities (including research) in the tidal Chesapeake Bay, its drainage basin and adjoining airshed, as well as adjacent offshore waters of the Middle Atlantic Bight. Recognizing that processes acting in Earth systems far from the bay also affect it, its environment and resources, CRC may also support appropriate projects far beyond the traditional Bay boundaries.

Purpose
Their goal is to encourage open exchange of information within the research community on specific topics and/or to inform potential users of regional science of recent results to promote information transfer for consideration in regional policy management decisions. The conferences have been large, 3-4 day events with accompanying proceedings or smaller, focused conferences. Through these events, CRC hopes to assemble the community’s most active contributors to ensure the rapid distribution of recent research results.

History
Agreement started in 1966 by Johns Hopkins University, the Smithsonian Institution, and the University of Maryland to collaborate in biological research and education at the Center for Environmental Studies (now the University of Maryland Center for Environmental Science). In 1972 the first three were joined by the Virginia Institute of Marine Science to form the Chesapeake Research Consortium in order to "foster and facilitate research germane to the region of the Chesapeake Bay." Environmental studies is the main focus of research for the consortium.

Funding
The consortium receives funding support from its member institutions, U.S. Environmental Protection Agency, National Oceanic and Atmospheric Administration, and National Science Foundation.

Institutional members
The following institutions are members:
 Johns Hopkins University
 Old Dominion University
 Pennsylvania State University
 Smithsonian Institution
 University System of Maryland
 Virginia Institute of Marine Science
 Virginia Tech

Conferences
The CRC either hosts or co- hosts regional conferences that are designed to promote the distribution of recent research in inform management of policy and decision making in communities. These conferences include:
 13th IWA Conf on Watershed & River Basin Mgmt - September 9–12, 2014
 20th Annual MWMC Conference: Looking to the Past to Guide our Future - November 21, 2014

Problems

Eutrophication, over-fertilization, and pollution runoff
One of the major problems with the bay is eutrophication. This is the result of excessive fertilizer runoff from farms which contains nitrogen. When the nitrogen is washed off into streams it makes its way to the bay, where it causes algae blooms. Algae blooms occur when excessive nutrients are used by algae to grow quickly and as a result, cover large areas of the surface of the water. This in turn blocks sunlight from reaching submerged aquatic vegetation, which will die as a result. Eventually the algae blooms will also die, and as a result of the decomposition that takes place, all the oxygen is used up in the area. The resulting effect is a dead zone, where dissolved oxygen content is so low that no wildlife can live in the area.

Solutions
The CRC proposed a possible plankton monitoring program which would help respond to this issue. Phytoplankton are part of the problem and by monitoring a population in an area and how it affects other aspects of life there, a general health index can be established. The proposed solution was to form workgroups involving bay program managers, experts to design specific elements of the workshops and plans, analytical experts to manage data collected and solve calculations while producing  plots for routine use and inspection. It would also use data sets for routine use in ecosystem modeling used in fisheries management for refining needed elements and products for fisheries management. This was proposed because very few projects such as these were developed previously. The report goes on to state there must be input from scientists and managers to ensure that the monitoring is addressing the actual concerns in question. Concerns would include an index of performance metrics directing specific areas such as fish nurseries and spawning areas. By controlling these factors a threshold could be established for when plankton would require management intervention or single a checkpoint achieved.

References

External links
 
 
 
 

1972 establishments in the United States
Academic conferences
Chesapeake Bay
Environmental research
Organizations established in 1972
Science and technology in Maryland